A surau is an Islamic assembly building in some regions of Sumatra and the Malay Peninsula used for worship and religious instruction. Generally smaller physical structures, its ritual functions are similar to a mosque, allow men and women, and are used more for religious instruction and festive prayers. They depend more on grassroots support and funding. They can be compared to the Arab zawiya. In Minangkabau society, they continued pre-Islamic traditions of a men's house, and are built on high posts.

In contemporary usage, "surau" is often used to refer to either a small mosque, or a designated room in a public building (such as a shopping mall, a university, or a rest stop along a highway) for men or women to do salah.

Indonesia 

Surau among the Minankabau of Sumatra date to pre-Islamic times. Men lived together in them. The first Islamic Surau in Minangkabau is believed to have been built in the late 17th century in the coastal town of Ulakan.

Smaller surau are known as Surau Mangaji, and consist mostly of a small room for to 20 students and one teacher who is usually also the Imam and teaches Quran recitation. Large Surau, during the heyday of Surau culture in the 18th century, help up to 1,000 students and included up to 20 buildings.

The central figure of Surau was the Tuanku shaikh who mostly as carriers of Baraka was. He oversaw in large Surau usually a large number of teachers who as Guru were called and had mostly learned even with him or even met with him. The establishment and maintenance of Surau performed usually by foundations (waqf) and donations from parents as well as by the work of Surau residents. Minangkabau Surau has great similarities with the institution of the pesantren, which was initially distributed only to Java.

Many Surau were simultaneously centers of Sufi orders. In this case, the Tuanku Shaikh was the spiritual leader of Surau-residents, and this kept him the oath of allegiance. The Surau of Ulakan served as a center of Shattāriyya Order, which had been introduced by Burhan ad-Din, a student of Abd al-Ra'uf as-Singkilī. Other orders, which had their own Surau in Minangkabau, were the Naqshbandīyya and Qadiriyya. Some students visited various Surau succession and could be introduced in different orders. The fact that the students of Tuanku shaikh as Mureed or Faqīr are called, shows the great impact of Sufism on the Surau culture.

Early 19th century was the Surau system of Hāddschis that in Mecca with the teachings of the Wahhabi had come into contact, radically questioned. They and their followers, the so-called Padris, denounced the Surau as centers of dissemination un-Islamic teachings and practices and burning some of them during the so-called Padri Wars (1821–38) down. Other steps that heralded the demise of Surau culture, were in 1870 to introduce a new type of school, the so-called Sekolah Nagari, by the Dutch, and in 1900 the intellectual attacks of reformist Muslims who denounced the Surau as hoards of backwardness and own secular schools established. Today, there are tentative attempts to revive the Surau culture at the Minangkabau.

Outside Indonesia

Malaysia and Singapore

On the Malay Peninsula, the functional difference between mosque and Surau is not always so clear. In rural areas the Surau was for centuries the center of Islamic worship and thus tantamount to a mosque. In today's urban area in Malaysia and Singapore there are also Surau. Sharifa Zaleha who has dealt with Surau in Malaysia, concludes that the difference between the two institutions is that the mosques are built by the state, while the Surau depend on public initiatives. As with Minangkaba the success of the Surau depends very much on the religious scholars involved. During the heyday of the Dakwah movement in the 1970s and 1980s the Surau in Malaysia were also centers of student life, with students spending several nights a month in Surau to perform i'tikaf.

See also

List of mosques in Indonesia
Mosque
Musallah, the equivalent structure in other Muslim countries.

References

Further reading

Islam in the Indonesian World: An Account of Institutional Formation by Azyumardi Azra Mizan Pustaka 2006

Islamic buildings
Sumatra
Architecture in Indonesia
Peninsular Malaysia
Architecture in Malaysia
Buildings and structures in Sumatra
Islam in Indonesia
Islam in Malaysia
Islam in West Sumatra
Islamic architecture
Islamic terminology
Islamic education